María de la Paz Campos Trigos (born 2 January 1976), known professionally as Paz Vega, is a Spanish actress.

She became popular for her performance in comedy television series 7 vidas. Her film credits include Sex and Lucia (2001), Spanglish (2004), 10 Items or Less (2006), Madagascar 3: Europe's Most Wanted (2012), All Roads Lead to Rome (2015), Acts of Vengeance (2017), and Rambo: Last Blood (2019). She played the role of Catalina Creel in the 2019 television series Cuna de lobos.

Early life
Vega was born in Seville, Andalusia, Spain, in 1976 to a housewife mother and a father who was a former bullfighter. Vega's younger sister has performed as a flamenco dancer. Vega has described her family as "traditional" and Catholic. She took her stage name from her grandmother. Vega decided to become an actress after attending a performance of Federico García Lorca's play, La casa de Bernarda Alba, when she was 16.

After completing compulsory education at 16, Vega was accepted at the Centro Andaluz de Teatro stage school. She studied there for two years and took another two years studying journalism. She next moved to Madrid to seek her future.

Screen career 

Vega made her television debut in the Spanish TV series, Menudo es mi padre, which starred rumba singer El Fary. She appeared in two other series in 1997—Más que amigos and Compañeros.

In 1999, she made her film debut in Zapping. The same year, she also had a minor role in the David Menkes movie I Will Survive, alongside Emma Suárez, and Juan Diego Botto.

Vega found success in 1999's TV series 7 Vidas. The series was billed as a Spanish Friends and became one of the country's best-loved domestic sitcoms. Vega played Laura, a perky Andalusian girl who had come to stay with David, who had recently come out of a coma. The series was broadcast on Telecinco and finished on 12 April 2006, albeit without Vega.

In 2001, she starred in Julio Médem's film Sex and Lucia, which brought her to the attention of a larger audience. However, she received prominent exposure, particularly to American audiences, when she appeared in the 2004 James L. Brooks American film Spanglish opposite Adam Sandler. In 2006, she co-starred with American actor Morgan Freeman in the independent film 10 Items or Less, directed by Brad Silberling. In 2008, she co-starred with Gabriel Macht, Samuel L. Jackson, and Scarlett Johansson in The Spirit. In 2011, Vega had a role in Michele Placido's film Vallanzasca –The Angels of Evil.

Vega also works as a model; she is signed to 1/One Management in New York City. In May 2011, Vega replaced Penélope Cruz as the face for L'Oreal Spain.

In 2018, she participated in the third season of the reality cooking show MasterChef Celebrity.

In 2019, Vega appeared in Televisa to portray the lead character Catalina Creel in the miniseries Cuna de Lobos, based on the 1986 original telenovela of the same title. The same year, she portrayed an independent Mexican reporter in Rambo: Last Blood, in which she co-starred with Sylvester Stallone.

Personal life 
Vega and her Venezuelan husband, Orson Salazar, had their first child, a son, in May 2007. Their second child, a daughter, was born in July 2009. Their third child, another son, was born in August 2010. They married in 2002.

Filmography

Film

Television

Accolades

References

External links

 
 

1976 births
Living people
People from Seville
Spanish film actresses
Spanish television actresses
20th-century Spanish actresses
Chicas Almodóvar
21st-century Spanish actresses
Masked Singer winners
Actresses from Andalusia
Chopard Trophy for Female Revelation winners